

Sandalford Wines is a privately owned Australian winery business based at Caversham, in the Swan Valley, the focal point of the Swan District wine region of Western Australia.  Sandalford owns and operates wineries and vineyards both in Caversham and at Wilyabrup, in Western Australia's Margaret River wine region.

The company traces its origins back to 1840, when John Septimus Roe, the first Surveyor-General of the Swan River Colony, was granted  on the banks of the Swan River by Queen Victoria, in recognition of his services to the colony.

In the same year, Captain Roe planted Western Australia's first vines at the property, which he named Sandalford after an estate owned by his family on the site of a priory built in 1066.  However, winemaking only became a commercial venture at Sandalford after World War II; until then it had been a hobby and a sideline.

Sandalford now also makes the wines marketed under the brand name "Element".

See also

 Australian wine
 List of wineries in Western Australia
 Western Australian wine

References

Notes

Bibliography

External links
Sandalford Wines – official site

Wilyabrup, Western Australia
Wineries in Western Australia
Australian companies established in 1840
Food and drink companies established in 1840